The United States Federation of Worker Cooperatives (USFWC) is a federation of worker cooperatives in the United States.  USFWC was founded at the U.S. Conference of Democratic Workplaces in Minneapolis, Minnesota in May 2004.

The Federation was sponsored by The Cooperative Foundation in addition to other cooperative support organizations. It was created partly in response to growing regional organizing among United States worker cooperatives and to foster the sharing of information and resources between national gatherings.

Meetings
The membership meets annually. The Federation holds a biennial conference called The Democracy at Work Conference in conjunction with the annual meeting. The schedule for the meetings/conference is as follows:
2006 New York City (and Conference)
2008 New Orleans (and Conference)
2009 Madison
2010 San Francisco (and conference)
2011 Austin, TX
2012 Boston (and conference)
 2016 Austin (and conference)
 2018 Los Angeles (and conference)

Membership

USFWC membership classes:
Worker Cooperatives include organizations that meet the standard for a democratic workplace according to the CICOPA World Declaration on Worker Co-operatives.
Democratic Workplaces include organizations that may fall short of the World Declaration, but still exist as a democratic workplace such as democratic Employee Stock Ownership Plans (ESOP) owned by 100% of its workers.
Federation Partners include any local and regional association of three or more workplaces.
Cooperative Developers receive one vote per developer (or organization of developers).
Start-up Workplaces include organizations that are either in start-up mode or transitioning to a worker co-operative from another type of business.
Associates are organizations that support worker co-operatives and worker rights but are not worker co-operatives, collectives or democratic workplaces. Consumer co-operatives, labor unions, and ESOPs with less than 100% worker control are examples. This class does not have voting rights.
Individual Allies may join the organization but do not have voting rights.

Board of directors
The Federation is governed by a nine-member board of directors. The Board oversees the Federation and the Executive Director. Members:

 Eastern Representative – Aaron Dawson
 Northern Representative – Rebecca Kemble
 Western Representative – Yilda Campos
 Southern Representative – Anna Boyer
 At Large Directors
 Ben Mauer
 David Smathers Moore
 Scott Crow

See also
 Network of Bay Area Worker Cooperatives
 Worker cooperative

References

External links
 

Worker cooperatives of the United States
Cooperative federations
Organizations established in 2004
2004 establishments in the United States